Ducuing is a French surname. Notable people with the surname include:

François Ducuing (1817–1875), French journalist and politician
Gabriel Auguste Ferdinand Ducuing (1885–1940), French Army officer
Nans Ducuing (born 1991), French rugby union player
Paul Ducuing (1867–1949), French sculptor

French-language surnames